Several ships have been named Regulus for the star Regulus:

 was built in Spain. The British captured her in 1797. She spent her career trading to the Cape of Good Hope and West Africa. She was briefly a privateer. She was broken up in 1806.
Regulus was a French privateer that  captured in December 1804; she became , there being an  already in service.
, of 378 tons (bm), was launched at Whitby. In 1825 she carried assisted immigrants from Cork to Quebec under a scheme promoted by Peter Robinson. She was last listed in 1855.
 was a steamship registered in St. John's, Dominion of Newfoundland.
In September 1917 she rescued the crew of  after Port Kembla struck a mine. Regulus was broken up in 1936.

See also

Ship names